Dodgeball currently has two governing bodies, The World Dodgeball Federation (WDBF) with 87 member nations and World Dodgeball Association (WDA) with 62 national federations. The following information is for the WDA:

WDA World Ranking points are awarded to member nations who are part of the WDA based purely on their final position at recognized international tournaments.This does not include WDBF rankings. These events include, WDA World Cup qualifiers, the World Championship and World Invitational.
Each category (men's, women's and mixed) will have their own rankings system.

How It Works
The WDA's World Ranking points are awarded to member nations based purely on their final position at
recognised international tournaments. These events include, World Cup qualifiers, the
World Cup and World Invitational. Each category (men’s, women’s and mixed) will have their own rankings system.

Calculations
National team rankings are built on an eight-year performance. Following the eight-year cycle, the new year of results will override the first year of the cycle, to be included in the rankings system. Meaning, only results within the four-year bracket will be included in the points system.
WDA World Ranking Points Formula
World Cup (Men, Women, Mixed):
1st – 240 points
2nd – 220 points Last Place – 120 points
World Cup Qualifiers (Men, Women, Mixed):
1st – 120 points 2nd – 110 points Last Place – 20 points
World Invitational (Men, Women, Mixed):
1st – 110 points 2nd – 100 points Last Place – 10 points
The points awarded after 2nd place are spread evenly, in an attempt to ensure balance between international tournaments with different-sized fields.
For instance, finishing 3rd out of 10 teams is considered to be a higher accomplishment than finishing 3rd out of 6 teams. Given that points are not fixed beyond 2nd place, a calculation is used to determine how many points are awarded for each position. The calculation gives the difference between any two consecutive positions from 2nd through to last.

WDA Federations

African

Asia Pacific

European

Latin American

North America and Caribbean

Notes and references

Dodgeball